The Sound the Speed the Light is the fourth studio album by American post-punk band Mission of Burma, released in October 2009 by record label Matador. The album is the third post-reunion album.

Track listing
"1, 2, 3, Partyy!" (Clint Conley) – 2:46
"Possession" (Roger Miller) – 4:27
"Blunder" (Peter Prescott) – 3:39
"Forget Yourself" (Miller) – 4:53
"After the Rain" (Miller) – 3:22
"SSL 83" (Conley) – 2:49
"One Day We Will Live There" (Prescott) – 2:43
"So Fuck It" (Miller) – 2:46
"Feed" (Holly Anderson and Conley) – 3:49
"Good Cheer" (Prescott) – 2:45
"Comes Undone" (Miller) – 3:08
"Slow Faucet" (Miller) – 4:27

References

External links
 

2009 albums
Matador Records albums
Mission of Burma albums